The Melbourne Victory 2011–12 season is Melbourne Victory's seventh season in the Hyundai A-League, the highest level association football league in Australia.

Season summary
On 27 May 2011, erratic Costa Rican Marvin Angulo was axed by Melbourne Victory just weeks after his loan deal appeared set to be extended, while goalkeeper Michael Petkovic announced his retirement. Thai defender Surat Sukha left to join Buriram PEA after he was released by the Victory on compassionate grounds. It was also announced on 16 June 2011 that Adidas had signed a five-year deal as the club's official kit manufacturer. On 21 June 2011, Mehmet Durakovic was appointed as head coach of Melbourne Victory while former Socceroo and SBS football analyst Francis Awaritefe was appointed as Director of Football. However, after a brief five-month stint in his job as the Director of Football with Melbourne Victory, Awaritefe was axed by Melbourne Victory, after a run of poor results.

On 20 August 2011, Melbourne Victory officially confirmed the signing of Socceroos and former Leeds, Liverpool and Galatasaray player Harry Kewell on a three-year contract.

On 15 September 2011, it was announced Brazilian Fabio Alves had signed a one-year contract with Victory, after an impressive trial performance in a pre-season friendly against reigning champions Brisbane Roar.

On 4 October 2011, Ante Covic signed a one-year deal with Melbourne Victory as an injury replacement for Tando Velaphi who was ruled out for 12 weeks.

On 5 January 2012, it was announced that manager Mehmet Durakovic had been sacked due to poor performances throughout the season, with only three wins from their first 14 games. Assistant coach, Kevin Muscat, was appointed caretaker coach while the club searched for a new coach.

On 7 January 2012, the former manager of Ipswich Town, Jim Magilton, was appointed as interim manager until the end of the current season.

On 23 January 2012 it was reported that Melbourne Victory was to secure Mark Milligan on loan until the end of the season. It was confirmed on 24 January that Milligan has signed the contract for a loan deal until the end of the 2011–12 A-League season. On 24 January 2012 it was confirmed that Julius Davies had signed with Melbourne Victory after impressing the staff during his two weeks of training with the club, although he was not cleared to play until 16 March 2012. On 8 February 2012 Hong Kong based Spanish defender Ubay Luzardo secured a loan deal to Melbourne Victory until the end of the season.

Veterans Tom Pondeljak, Rodrigo Vargas and Fabio were released days before the final series began.

On 15 March, Victory confirmed the signing of sought-after Gold Coast United defender Adama Traore on a two-year deal. On 16 March, Jim Magilton boosted his defensive stocks for the upcoming season with the capture of Central Coast Mariners utility Sam Gallagher.

Melbourne Victory finished the 2011–2012 season in eighth place and missed the finals campaign. Magilton was not offered a further contract and departed the club in April 2012.

The Melbourne Victory 2011–12 season is Melbourne Victory's seventh A-League season.

Players

First team squad
As of 9 February 2012.

Player Notes

Transfers

Winter

In

 Isaka Cernak and Tando Velaphi were signed during season 2010/11 after regular season and in between final series for the AFC Champions League.

Out

Summer

In

Out

Coaching staff

Matches

2011–2012 Pre-season friendlies

2011–2012 Hyundai A-League fixtures

Exhibition Match

Results summary

Results by round

Statistics

Appearances

Ladder

References

External links
Official website
A-League website
Melbourne Victory Videos

2011-12
2011–12 A-League season by team